Ashley Elizabeth Atkinson (born August 6, 1977), known professionally as Ashlie Atkinson, is an American character actress who works in movies and television (with over 90 credits) – as well as in theater. Atkinson is known for her work as Ace on Happy!, Peaches in the Netflix film Juanita, Connie in the Spike Lee film BlacKkKlansman, and Janice in the fourth season of Mr. Robot.

Early life and education
Atkinson was born in Little Rock, Arkansas. Her father was a doctor and her mother was a nurse. Her family has lived in Arkansas for many generations.

In 1995, Atkinson graduated from Pulaski Academy in Little Rock, Arkansas. Atkinson attended Barnard College of Columbia University in New York City for three semesters but in 1996, moved back to Arkansas and eventually transferred to Hendrix College, where she had previously attended a summer program through Arkansas Governor's School for drama. In 2001, Atkinson graduated from Hendrix College with a degree in theater arts.

In 2003, after moving back to New York City when she was 24, Atkinson graduated from the Neighborhood Playhouse School of the Theatre. While at the Neighborhood Playhouse, she studied the Meisner technique.

Career

Film and television 
While at the Neighborhood Playhouse School, director Jace Alexander saw Atkinson perform in a showcase there. This led to a 2004 guest starring appearance in the TV show Law & Order and a six-episode arc in the Denis Leary TV series, Rescue Me.

Atkinson then starred in a breakout role as Helen, the sweet-faced, plus-size librarian in Neil LaBute's 2004 off-Broadway play Fat Pig. The role garnered her a Theatre World Award for Outstanding Off-Broadway Debut, as well as nominations for both a Lucille Lortel Award and an Outer Critics Circle Award. 

In 2007, Atkinson appeared in a Broadway revival of the Terrence McNally play, The Ritz.

In 2011, Atkinson hit the three guest star appearance in the Law & Order franchise, following her 2005 debut on the original Law & Order with a 2007 appearance on Law & Order: Criminal Intent, and then in 2011 both Law & Order: Criminal Intent and Law & Order: Special Victims Unit.

In 2012, Atkinson guest starred on the TV series Boardwalk Empire as Gyp's wife, Gianconda Rosetti. She appeared on a 2012 episode of 30 Rock.

In 2013, Atkinson portrayed Rochelle Applebaum in the Martin Scorsese film The Wolf of Wall Street.

In 2013 and 2014, Atkinson had a four episode arc in the TV show, F to 7th. From 2013 to 2014, she was featured on the American remake of Gavin and Stacey, called Us & Them in the role of Nessa.

In 2018, Atkinson played the role of Connie Kendrickson in the Academy Award-winning film BlacKkKlansman, directed by Spike Lee. She had previously worked with Lee in the 2006 Denzel Washington film, Inside Man. Atkinson also worked alongside Lee's sister Joie Lee, contributing sound work on his 2008 WWII drama, Miracle at St. Anna. Also in 2018, Atkinson had a recurring role on the TV series, One Dollar.

From 2018 to 2019, Atkinson was Ace, Internal Affairs Detective, in four episodes of the Syfy TV show Happy!, a live-action/adult animated black comedy/action-drama television series.

In 2019, Atkinson portrayed Mrs. Fosse in the mini-series Fosse/Verdon. She had a two episode arc in the 2019 Allison Tolman thriller Emergence and played a trucker in the ensemble opposite Alfre Woodard in the Netflix movie, Juanita.

And also in 2019, Atkinson was on the fourth and final season of Mr. Robot, playing the character Janice.

Other work
From 2003, Atkinson is a former skater and long-time member of the 5-time world champion Gotham Girls roller derby team under the name of "Margaret Thrasher (Prime Minister of Your Demise)", although she has since retired.

In 2004, Atkinson appeared in the music video for the Kings of Leon song, "Four Kicks" off their album Aha Shake Heartbreak.

In 2006, Atkinson became the face of a fictional character called Chunky Pam. Her character, Chunky Pam, was featured in three videos: in a Christmas promotion for MTV called "Merry X.X.X.L.M.A.S. (Pam I Am)", in a Valentine's Day promotion called "Pampered", and a one-off music video titled "Dirrrty Jerzy", in which she raps about being from New Jersey.

In 2016, Atkinson appeared in the Ubisoft video game WATCH_DOGS 2 as Lenni.

In 2017, Atkinson starred as Dakota "Dak" Prentiss in a 14-episode noir science fiction thriller audio drama podcast called Steal the Stars, the story of two government employees guarding the biggest secret in the world: a crashed UFO.

Personal life
In 2015, Atkinson married gaffer, musician, and filmmaker Leon Chase. The couple were married at the Arkansas music venue the White Water Tavern and live in Brooklyn.Shortly after that, Atkinson came out as queer.

Filmography

Film

Television

Awards
 2005: Theatre World Award, Outstanding Off-Broadway Debut for Fat Pig
 2005: Lucille Lortel Award (nominee), Outstanding Lead Actress for Fat Pig
 2005: Outer Critics Circle Award, Outstanding Featured Actress in a Play (nominee), for Fat Pig
 2014: Hendrix College, Outstanding Young Alumnus Award

Selected theater
 2005: The 24 Hour Plays – as Winnie
 2005: Fat Pig by Neil LaBute – as Helen (Lucille Lortel Theatre)<ref name=2004_NYPost-FatPig>{{cite news|last1=Hoffman|first1=Barbara|title=The Bravest Actress in New York – Would You Star in Something Called 'Fat Pig?|url=https://nypost.com/2004/12/02/the-bravest-actress-in-new-york-would-you-star-in-something-called-fat-pig/|work=New York Post|date=2 December 2004|language=en}}</ref>
 2005: Making Marilyn – as Marilyn Monroe (Bridge Theatre Company at Theatre 54)
 2005: The Butcher of Baraboo by Marisa Wegrzyn – as Midge (Second Stage Theatre)
 2007: The Ritz by Terrence McNally – as Vivian Proclo (Roundabout Theatre)
 2010: As You Like It by William Shakespeare (The Bridge Project)
 2010: The Tempest by William Shakespeare (The Bridge Project)
 2010: Psychomachia by Jennifer Lane – as Lydia (Theatre 54 @ Shelter Studios)
 2011: The Book Club Play by Karen Zacarías (Arena Stage)
 2013: January Joiner: A Weight Loss Horror Comedy by Laura Jacqmin – as Terry (Long Wharf Theatre)
 2014: Love, Loss, and What I Wore by Nora and Delia Ephron (Rubicon Theatre Company)
 2015: Steve by Mark Gerrard – as Carrie (Pershing Square Signature Center / The Romulus Linney Courtyard Theatre)
 2016: The Forgotten Woman by Jonathan Tolins (Bay Street Theater)
 2017: Imogen Says Nothing'' by Aditi Kapil (Yale Rep at Binger Center for New Theatre)

References

External links
 
 
 

1977 births
Living people
American film actresses
American stage actresses
American television actresses
Actresses from Little Rock, Arkansas
Barnard College alumni
Roller derby skaters
American roller skaters
Hendrix College alumni
21st-century American actresses
Theatre World Award winners
Sportspeople from Little Rock, Arkansas
Queer actors
LGBT people from Arkansas